The 2020 Bett1Hulks Championship is a ATP tournament organised for male professional tennis players, held in Cologne, Germany, in mid-October 2020 on indoor hard courts. It was primarily organised due to the cancellation of many tournaments during the 2020 season, because of the ongoing COVID-19 pandemic. It is the first edition of the tournament, and it will take place at the Lanxess Arena in Cologne, Germany, from October 19 through 25, 2020.

Singles main-draw entrants

Seeds

 Rankings are as of 12 October 2020.

Other entrants
The following players received wildcards into the singles main draw:
  Daniel Altmaier
  Andy Murray
  Jannik Sinner

The following players received entry using a special exempt:
  Marco Cecchinato
  Danilo Petrović

The following players received entry from the qualifying draw:
  Damir Džumhur
  Egor Gerasimov
  Pierre-Hugues Herbert
  Dennis Novak

The following players received entry as lucky losers:
  James Duckworth
  Sumit Nagal
  Oscar Otte
  Alexei Popyrin

Withdrawals
  Roberto Bautista Agut → replaced by  Sumit Nagal
  Hubert Hurkacz → replaced by  James Duckworth
  Filip Krajinović → replaced by  Yoshihito Nishioka
  Andy Murray → replaced by  Alexei Popyrin
  Gaël Monfils → replaced by  Steve Johnson
  Benoît Paire → replaced by  Gilles Simon
  Guido Pella → replaced by  Tennys Sandgren
  Danilo Petrović → replaced by  Oscar Otte
  Sam Querrey → replaced by  Fernando Verdasco
  Lorenzo Sonego → replaced by  Jordan Thompson
  Stan Wawrinka → replaced by  Alejandro Davidovich Fokina

Doubles main-draw entrants

Seeds

 Rankings are as of 12 October 2020

Other entrants
The following pairs received wildcards into the doubles main draw:
  Daniel Altmaier /  Oscar Otte 
  Alexander Zverev /  Mischa Zverev

Champions

Singles

  Alexander Zverev def.  Diego Schwartzman, 6–2, 6–1

Doubles

  Raven Klaasen /  Ben McLachlan def.  Kevin Krawietz /  Andreas Mies, 6–2, 6–4

See also
 2020 Bett1Hulks Indoors

References

External links
Official website

2020 ATP Tour
2020 in German tennis
October 2020 sports events in Germany